The 1897 Syracuse Orangemen football team represented Syracuse University as an independent during the 1897 college football season. Led by first-year head coach Frank E. Wade, the Orangemen compiled a record of 5–3–1.

Schedule

References

Syracuse
Syracuse Orange football seasons
Syracuse Orangemen football